The Shidehara Cabinet is the 44th Cabinet of Japan led by Kijūrō Shidehara from October 9, 1945, to May 22, 1946.

Cabinet

Reshuffled Cabinet 
A Cabinet reshuffle took place on January 13, 1946.

References 

Cabinet of Japan
1945 establishments in Japan
Cabinets established in 1945
Cabinets disestablished in 1946